The 2015 Corby Borough Council election took place on 7 May 2015 to elect members of Corby Borough Council in Northamptonshire, England. This was on the same day as other local elections. The Labour Party retained control of the council, which it has held continuously since 1979.

Ward-by-Ward Results

Beanfield Ward (3 seats)

Central Ward (2 seats)

Danesholme Ward (2 seats)

Kingswood and Hazel Leys Ward (3 seats)

Lloyds Ward (3 seats)

Lodge Park (3 seats)

Oakley North Ward (2 seats)

Oakley South Ward (3 seats)

Rowlett Ward (2 seats)

Rural West Ward (1 seat)

Stanion and Corby Village Ward (2 seats)

Weldon and Gretton Ward (2 seats)

References

2015 English local elections
May 2015 events in the United Kingdom
2015
2010s in Northamptonshire